Max Havelaar is a 1976 Dutch drama film directed by Fons Rademakers, based on the 1860 novel Max Havelaar by Multatuli. It was the country's submission for Best Foreign Language Film at the 49th Academy Awards, but was not accepted as a nominee.

Cast
 Peter Faber as Max Havelaar
 Sacha Bulthuis as Tine
 Adendu Soesilaningrat as Regent (as E.M. Adenan Soesilaningrat)
 Maruli Sitompul as Demang
 Krijn ter Braak as Verbrugge
 Carl van der Plas as Resident
 Rima Melati as Mevrouw Slotering
 Rutger Hauer as Duclari
 Joop Admiraal as Slotering
 Frans Vorstman as Gouverneur-Generaal
 Piet Burnama as Djaska (as Pitradjaja Burnama)
 Herry Lantho as Saïdjah
 Leo Beyers as Droogstoppel
 Nenny Zulaini as Adinda

See also
 List of submissions to the 49th Academy Awards for Best Foreign Language Film
 List of Dutch submissions for the Academy Award for Best Foreign Language Film

References

External links

1976 films
1970s historical drama films
Dutch historical drama films
1970s Dutch-language films
Films set in Indonesia
Films directed by Fons Rademakers
1976 drama films